Wolfenschiessen railway station is a Swiss railway station in the municipality of Wolfenschiessen in the canton of Nidwalden. It is on the Luzern–Stans–Engelberg line, owned by the Zentralbahn railway company.

Services 
The following services stop at Wolfenschiessen:

 Lucerne S-Bahn : hourly service to Lucerne.

The station is also served by a post bus service to Oberrickenbach, with eight services per day.

References

External links 
 

Railway stations in the canton of Nidwalden
Wolfenschiessen
Zentralbahn stations